The following is a list of Saturn Award winners for Best Actress on Television. The award is presented annually by the Academy of Science Fiction, Fantasy and Horror Films, honoring the work of actresses in science fiction, fantasy, and horror fiction on television. The winners are listed in bold (NOTE: Year refers to year of eligibility, the actual ceremonies are held the following year.)

As of the 47th Saturn Awards in 2022, the award is known as Best Actress in a Network or Cable Television Series and features a sister category: Saturn Award for Best Actress in a Streaming Television Series.

Winners and nominees

1990s

2000s

2010s

2020s

Multiple nominations
8 nominations
 Gillian Anderson

7 nominations
 Caitríona Balfe
 Sarah Michelle Gellar

6 nominations
 Evangeline Lilly
 Kyra Sedgwick

5 nominations
 Melissa Benoist
 Claudia Black
 Lena Headey
 Jennifer Love Hewitt
 Anna Torv

4 nominations
 Jennifer Garner
 Kristin Kreuk
 Kate Mulgrew

3 nominations
 Kristen Bell
 Vera Farmiga
 Jessica Lange
 Rachel Nichols
 Anna Paquin
 Sarah Paulson

2 nominations
 Jessica Alba
 Patricia Arquette
 Charisma Carpenter
 Claudia Christian
 Kim Dickens
 Shannen Doherty
 Mireille Enos
 Anna Gunn
 Sonequa Martin-Green
 Adrianne Palicki
 Candice Patton
 Rebecca Romijn
 Jeri Ryan
 Rhea Seehorn
 Amber Tamblyn

Multiple wins

4 awards
 Anna Torv (consecutive)

3 awards
 Caitríona Balfe

2 awards
 Jennifer Love Hewitt (consecutive)

See also
 Saturn Award for Best Actress in Streaming Presentation

External links
 Official site
 23rd, 24th, 25th, 26th, 27th, 28th, 29th, 30th, 31st, 32nd, 33rd, 34th, 35th, 36th, 37th, 38th, 39th, 40th, 41st, 42nd

Actress on Television
Television awards for Best Actress

ja:サターン主演女優賞#テレビ